Derrick Moore (born October 13, 1967) is a former professional American football running back for three seasons in the National Football League (NFL) for the Detroit Lions and Carolina Panthers. Moore has served as the team chaplain for the Georgia Tech Yellow Jackets football team. Moore set the NAIA single season rushing record in 1991.

Moore was featured in the TV Land reality series The Big 4-0 in 2008. Moore has served as the team chaplain for the Georgia Tech Yellow Jackets football team, often delivering pre-game motivational speeches to the players. Moore also filmed motivational speeches for the Atlanta Falcons during their 2017 playoff run.

References

External links
Pre-game speech delivered to Georgia Tech football team before 2006 North Carolina game.
Pre-game speech delivered to Georgia Tech football team before 2007 Notre Dame game.
Pre-game speech delivered to Georgia Tech football team before 2014 Miami game.

1967 births
Living people
Sportspeople from Albany, Georgia
American football running backs
Detroit Lions players
Carolina Panthers players
Northeastern State RiverHawks football players
Troy Trojans football players
Players of American football from Georgia (U.S. state)